Joaquín Muñoz may refer to:
 Joaquín Muñoz Peirats (1931-1987), Spanish politician
 Quino Muñoz (born 1975), Spanish tennis player
 Joaquín Muñoz (footballer, born 1992), Chilean footballer
 Joaquín Muñoz (footballer, born 1999), Spanish footballer